Medicine in Star Trek refers to the medical technologies, procedures and conditions as seen in the Star Trek fictional universe.

Medical technology 
Since the Star Trek fictional universe takes place roughly two or three centuries in our future, medical technology is portrayed as having grown to be far more sophisticated and advanced than current technology. When confronted with medical technology from older time periods, the characters often react apprehensively or skeptically to the relatively outdated modern procedures. For example, when visiting a hospital in the 1980s in Star Trek IV: The Voyage Home, Dr. McCoy (played by DeForest Kelley) shows disdain for his 20th century counterparts and compares their procedures to the Dark Ages and the Spanish Inquisition.

VISOR 

In the series Star Trek: The Next Generation, the character Geordi La Forge (played by LeVar Burton) wears a piece of technology called a VISOR that allows him to "see" despite being blind from birth by directly sending the information into his brain. The device also gave him the ability to see in the electromagnetic and infrared spectrums. The VISOR was used as a plot device throughout multiple episodes, including one where the VISOR is used to brainwash La Forge and one where emanations from the VISOR caused the character Worf to shift between parallel universes. Finally, in the movie Star Trek Generations, a group of Klingons used the VISOR to transmit the shield frequencies of the USS Enterprise (NCC-1701-D) to their ship, which allowed them to fatally cripple the Enterprise-D before they were destroyed. When La Forge is next seen, in the movie Star Trek: First Contact, he no longer wears his VISOR in lieu of the more innocuous-looking ocular implants.

The underlying mechanics of the VISOR (the transmission of images directly into the brain to overcome blindness) has been developed in the real world, albeit not as precisely as seen in Star Trek. In 2005, a team of medical researchers at Stanford University used a combination of microchip implants behind mice retinas and goggles equipped with LED readouts and a small camera to partially restore sight enough so that the mice could distinguish sets of black and white patterns. In 2006, a woman who lost her sight in a car crash had a similar procedure performed on her in Portugal which gave her the ability to see object outlines and differences in light.

Hypospray 

The hypospray has been featured in every Star Trek series as a tool used to give injections of medications. It has been shown in the series to be able to deliver injections through clothing, and does not carry any risk of cross-contamination as opposed to modern hypodermic needles. The concept of the hypospray was developed when producers on the original Star Trek series discovered that NBC's broadcast standards and practices prohibited the use of hypodermic syringes to inject medications; the needleless hypospray sidestepped this issue.

The hypospray has a real world counterpart called a jet injector, invented four years before the first Star Trek series debuted. It uses compressed air to inject the medication through the skin. However, unlike the hypospray, it carries the risk of cross-contamination, which has led to the jet injector falling into disuse. It also has limits for adjusting and controlling the exact dosage levels. The mechanisms used, particularly in spring-loaded designs, are one shot releases, with a coil that ejects the same amount of drug to the same depth every time, which limits the application to certain drugs or patient populations.

The U.S. Food and Drug Administration approved a device which uses ultrasonic waves to open pores on the skin, allowing the injection liquid to enter the bloodstream without the use of needles.

Currently, MIT researchers have engineered a device that delivers a tiny, high-pressure jet of medicine through the skin without the use of a hypodermic needle. The device can be programmed to deliver a range of doses to various depths, an improvement over similar jet-injection systems commercially available. Among other benefits, the technology may help reduce the potential for needle-stick injuries. A needleless device may also help improve necessary scheduled medications among patients who might otherwise avoid the discomfort of regularly injecting themselves with drugs such as insulin. The jet-injection system delivers a range of doses to variable depths in a highly controlled manner. The design is built around a mechanism called a "Lorentz-force actuator", a small, powerful magnet surrounded by a coil of wire that's attached to a piston inside a drug ampoule. When current is applied, it interacts with the magnetic field to produce a force that pushes the piston forward, ejecting the drug at high pressure and velocity, almost the speed of sound in air, out through the ampoule’s nozzle, an opening as wide as a mosquito sting. Through testing, the group found that various skin types may require different waveforms to deliver adequate volumes of drugs to the desired depth. For example, breaching a baby’s skin to deliver vaccine will not need as much pressure as adult skin, allowing doctors to tailor the pressure profile.

The team is also developing a version of the device for transdermal delivery of drugs ordinarily found in powdered form by programming the device to vibrate, turning powder into a “fluidized” form that can be delivered through the skin much like a liquid. A powder-delivery vehicle may help solve what's known as the “cold chain” problem: Vaccines delivered to developing countries need to be refrigerated if they are in liquid form. Often, coolers break down, spoiling whole batches of vaccines. Instead, Hunter says a vaccine that can be administered in powder form requires no cooling, avoiding the cold-chain problem.

Emergency Medical Hologram

For the television series Star Trek: Voyager an emergency medical hologram, The Doctor, was introduced. It was designed to be an expert on all fields of medicine, able to do anything any organic doctor could do.

References

External links

Star Trek
Medicine and health in fiction